Olle Kärner (born November 24, 1977 in Tartu) is an Estonian orienteering competitor from Tartu. He received a bronze medal in the long distance at the 2006 European Orienteering Championships in Otepää.

International results
His best result in the World Orienteering Championships is 5th place in the long distance in 2006. He received a silver medal in the open Nordic championships in 2005.

See also
 List of orienteers
 List of orienteering events

References

External links

1977 births
Living people
Estonian orienteers
Male orienteers
Foot orienteers
Sportspeople from Tartu
Competitors at the 2001 World Games